Irène Tolleret (born 17 August 1967) is a French politician of La République En Marche! (LREM) who was elected as a Member of the European Parliament in 2019.

Early life and education
Tolleret is a winegrower at the Pic Saint-Loup in a private domain which she owns.

Political career

Career in local politics
After the municipal elections of 2014, Tolleret was elected Mayor of Fontanès, in the Hérault. Representative of her commune in the community council of the community of communes of Grand Pic Saint-Loup, she is vice-president in charge of relations and European affairs.

In 2015, after the departmental elections, Tolleret became the substitute of Marie-Christine Bousquet, mayor of Lodève. Following Bousquet's death, Tolleret replaced her in the departmental council of Hérault.

Member of the European Parliament, 2019–present
During the 2019 European Parliament election, Tolleret was in ninth place on the La République En Marche!'s list of candidates. She has since been serving on the Committee on Women's Rights and Gender Equality.

In addition to her committee assignments, Tolleret is part of the Parliament's delegation with Japan, the European Parliament Intergroup on Children’s Rights, the European Parliament Intergroup on Climate Change, Biodiversity and Sustainable Developmentm, the European Parliament Intergroup on LGBT Rights and the MEPs Against Cancer group.

Recognition
In December 2020, Tolleret received the Food Safety award at The Parliament Magazine's annual MEP Awards.

References

1967 births
Living people
MEPs for France 2019–2024
21st-century women MEPs for France